Jawab is a 1995 Hindi movie directed by Ajay Kashyap, starring Raaj Kumar, Harish Kumar and Karishma Kapoor, with a supporting cast of Prem Chopra, Mukesh Khanna, Annu Kapoor and Farida Jalal.

Plot 
Rajeshwar is a kind-hearted industrialist leading widowed and childless life. Ashwini Saxena is Union Leader of the factory owned by Rajeshwar. Shobhraj is and orphan and Rajeshwar's unscrupulous brother-in-law responsible for the death of his wife, who is Rajeshwar's elder sister. Shobhraj sends his goons to attack Rajeshwar to avenge his insult, which is thwarted by Ashwini's interference. Ashwini's wife Parvati is expecting their second child, Suman. The friendship between Ashwini and Rajeshwar leads the former to sacrifice her infant daughter, Suman to the latter. Suman grows up as Rajeshwar's daughter.

18 Years later, Suman is studying in the same college as Ravi, who is revealed in flashback, to be Ashwini's adopted son, owing to a fire tragedy claiming the lives of his wife Parvati and his only son. Heartbroken Ashwini decides to leave the city. In the present day, Ravi and Suman fall in love after initial altercations, and wish to get married. Suman sends Ravi to meet her father, Rajeshwar, who asks him to send his father for guardian-level talks. It is then revealed that Ashwini after leaving the city had adopted Ravi, an orphan, and raised him as his own son. The bad experience of trusting an orphan, with brother-in-law Shobhraj, leads Rajeshwar to deny and reject the marriage proposal of Ravi for his daughter Suman, citing status differences. Dejected Ashwini leaves the bungalow with a determination to rise above his economic status and become a wealthy man to equate himself with Rajeshwar. Ashwini approaches a Bank for business loan, which is rejected by the Bank Manager citing financial security restrictions. After coming out of the bank, Ashwini realizes that the same bank is getting robbed. With some valiant effort, Ashwini is able to nab the entire gang and hand themover to the local police station. The robbers' gang turns out to have a hefty reward on their capture, which is then given to Ashwini as a felicitation. Ashwini ventures into business and establishes various organizations into diversified sectors, thereby conflicting and locking horns with Rajeshwar. In order to facilitate his prospects, Rajeshwar has to borrow money from various lenders. Shobhraj reappears as a saviour offering cash financial help to save Rajeshwar his prestige and goodwill in the market. In lieu of the cash help, Shobhraj gets a piece of land as a collateral.

Eventually Ashwini manages to expose Shobhraj and burn the signed papers for the land as a collateral. Meanwhile Suman learns from Aapa about her originality and her relation with Ashwini Kumar. An exchange of emotional outbursts leads both the patriarchs to shake hands, embrace each other and agree to the wedding of their children Ravi and Suman.

Cast
Raaj Kumar as Ashwini Kumar Saxena
Harish Kumar as Ravi A. Saxena 
Karishma Kapoor as Suman
Mukesh Khanna as Rajeshwar
Farida Jalal as Rajeshwar's Domestic Helper 
Prem Chopra as Shobhraj
Kishore Bhanushali as Johnny
Sharad Sankla as Charlie Chaplin
Tiku Talsania as Scientist Dr.Inder Kumar
Rohini Hattangadi as Mrs. Lucy Inder Kumar
Deven Bhojani as Popatlal, Lucy's Nephew
Sudhir  as Security Guard
Rana Jung Bahadur as Suman's neighbor Lalwani
Raj Kishore as Police Inspector
Annu Kapoor as Laadle
Maya Alagh as Parvati Saxena (Guest Appearance)
Nayana Apte Joshi as Late Mrs. Rajeshwar seen only in Photo-frame
Yunus Parvez as Minister
Bob Christo as Goon attacking Rajeshwar
Mahesh Anand as Bank Robber Gang Leader
Dinyar Contractor as College Principal

Soundtrack

References

External links 
 

1995 films
1990s Hindi-language films
Films scored by Anu Malik